María José Martínez is the name of:

 María José Martínez Guerrero (born 1956), Spanish athlete and coach, suspect in the Operación Galgo
 María José Martínez Sánchez (born 1982), Spanish tennis player
 Maria José Martínez-Patiño (born 1961), Spanish athlete